Senator Bloom may refer to:

Isaac Bloom (1747–1803), New York State Senate
Jeremiah B. Bloom (1913–1983), New York State Senate
Moses Bloom (1833–1893), Iowa State Senate
Prescott E. Bloom (1942–1986), Illinois State Senate